Andrew Burn Suter (1830–1895) was the second Anglican bishop of Nelson whose episcopate spanned a 26-year-period during the second half of the 19th century.

He was born in London, and educated at St Paul's School and Trinity College, Cambridge. He was ordained in 1855. After a curacy at St Dunstan-in-the-West he was Vicar of All Saints, Mile End until 1866. and his appointment to New Zealand. He resigned in 1891 and died on 29 March 1895.

Legacy
The plant Pimelea suteri was named in his honour by Thomas Kirk.

References

1830 births
Anglican clergy from London
Alumni of Trinity College, Cambridge
Anglican bishops of Nelson
19th-century Anglican bishops in New Zealand
1895 deaths